Keystone Watch Case Co. was the name of a conglomerate of watch companies assembled by Theophilus Zurbrugg by 1904.

Keystone purchased the rights to the E. Howard name (a legacy of the Howard Watch Company) in 1902 and sold Keystone-Howard watches.

References 

Watchmaking conglomerates